Ossian Everett Mills (February 16, 1856 – December 26, 1920) was the founder of Phi Mu Alpha Sinfonia Fraternity of America, at the New England Conservatory of Music in Boston, Massachusetts, on October 6, 1898.

References

1856 births
1920 deaths
Phi Mu Alpha Sinfonia
New England Conservatory faculty
College fraternity founders